Brent Macaffer (born 29 February 1988) is a former professional Australian rules footballer who played for the Collingwood Football Club in the Australian Football League (AFL).  He was recruited in the 2006 AFL draft.

Macaffer is one of a string of players to have been recruited by Collingwood from Gippsland. Despite his small stature, Macaffer led the TAC Cup U/18 goalkicking in 2006, and was named at full forward in the Team of the Year. Macaffer has good pace and can push up the ground to play in different positions.

Macaffer won the Joseph Wren Award for Best Collingwood VFL player in 2008, along with former Collingwood player Justin Crow.

Macaffer switched his guernsey to number three at the end of the 2012 season as tribute to his late friend and former team mate John McCarthy who died during the 2012 offseason.

In the 2013 AFL season Macaffer was utilised as more of a tagger/inside mid, a notable performance was keeping St Kilda star Nick Dal Santo to 16 disposals at 44% efficiency in Round 6. At the end of the 2013 season, Champion Data rated the AFL's top 18 taggers and Macaffer was rated the 3rd best in the league behind Ryan Crowley and Ed Curnow. Macaffer had won 14/16 of his roles which included some of the best Midfielders in the game with the likes of Nick Dal Santo, David Mundy, Joel Selwood, Josh P. Kennedy, Pearce Hanley, Dyson Heppell, Kieren Jack, Andrew Gaff, Daniel Wells, Travis Boak, plus others. Nathan Buckley moving Macaffer into the middle as a tagger reinvented him from the defensive forward role (Which he still plays from time to time) and he cemented himself in the strong Collingwood midfield with the likes of Dane Swan, Scott Pendlebury, Dayne Beams, Luke Ball and Steele Sidebottom and played a full season for the first time since Collingwoods Premiership Season in 2010.

On 22 August 2016, he announced he would retire at the end of the season, along with 2010 premiership team-mate Alan Toovey. Macaffer was awarded for his consistent season at VFL level with the Joseph Wren Memorial Trophy and for his clubmanship with the Darren Millane Award.

In 2018 Brent played for Eltham in the local Northern Football League. He kicked 12 goals in 19 games and was awarded the club's best and fairest award.

On 13 February 2019 Brent was honoured by being awarded Collingwood life membership.

Statistics

|- style="background:#eaeaea;"
! scope="row" style="text-align:center" | 2009
|
| 30 || 5 || 4 || 4 || 31 || 28 || 59 || 19 || 23 || 0.8 || 0.8 || 6.2 || 5.6 || 11.8 || 3.8 || 4.6
|- 
! scope="row" style="text-align:center" | 2010
|
| 30 || 21 || 16 || 14 || 173 || 149 || 322 || 88 || 98 || 0.8 || 0.7 || 8.2 || 7.1 || 15.3 || 4.2 || 4.7
|- style="background:#eaeaea;"
! scope="row" style="text-align:center" | 2011
|
| 30 || 4 || 1 || 1 || 31 || 16 || 47 || 14 || 9 || 0.3 || 0.3 || 7.8 || 4.0 || 11.8 || 3.5 || 2.3
|- 
! scope="row" style="text-align:center" | 2012
|
| 30 || 0 || — || — || — || — || — || — || — || — || — || — || — || — || — || —
|- style="background:#eaeaea;"
! scope="row" style="text-align:center" | 2013
|
| 3 || 22 || 7 || 4 || 201 || 106 || 307 || 99 || 85 || 0.3 || 0.2 || 9.1 || 4.8 || 14.0 || 4.5 || 3.9
|- 
! scope="row" style="text-align:center" | 2014
|
| 3 || 21 || 4 || 5 || 176 || 108 || 284 || 80 || 86 || 0.2 || 0.2 || 8.4 || 5.1 || 13.5 || 3.8 || 4.1
|-  style="background:#eaeaea;"
! scope="row" style="text-align:center" | 2015
|
| 3 || 0 || — || — || — || — || — || — || — || — || — || — || — || — || — || —
|- 
! scope="row" style="text-align:center" | 2016
|
| 3 || 4 || 1 || 1 || 17 || 16 || 33 || 4 || 15 || 0.3 || 0.3 || 4.3 || 4.0 || 8.3 || 1.0 || 3.8
|- class="sortbottom"
! colspan=3| Career
! 77
! 33
! 29
! 629
! 423
! 1052
! 304
! 316
! 0.4
! 0.4
! 8.2
! 5.5
! 13.7
! 4.0
! 4.1
|}

References

External links

1988 births
Living people
Australian rules footballers from Victoria (Australia)
Collingwood Football Club players
Collingwood Football Club Premiership players
Gippsland Power players
One-time VFL/AFL Premiership players